NAFO may refer to:

 Northwest Atlantic Fisheries Organization
 North Atlantic Fellas Organization, an Internet meme and social media phenomenon
 For the headgear of Senegal called Nafo see Kufi